Eugenia Ivanovna Kolosova (1780 – 1869), was a Russian Empire ballerina.

She was engaged at the Imperial Theatres in 1799-1826, during which she had a successful career as first a solo ballerina and later as a dramatic actress.

References

1780 births
1869 deaths
Ballerinas from the Russian Empire
Actresses from the Russian Empire
Burials at Tikhvin Cemetery
18th-century ballet dancers from the Russian Empire
19th-century ballet dancers from the Russian Empire
19th-century actresses from the Russian Empire
Russian stage actresses